Nationality words link to articles with information on the nation's poetry or literature (for instance, Irish or France).

Events
 September 19 – Imprisoned in the Tower of London on the eve of being hanged, drawn and quartered for his part in the Babington Plot, English poet Chidiock Tichborne writes his Elegy ("My prime of youth is but a frost of cares").
 September 22 – Battle of Zutphen: English poet, critic, courtier and soldier Sir Philip Sidney is fatally wounded.

Works published

England
 Thomas Churchyard, The Epitaph of Sir Phillip Sidney (Sidney was fatally wounded at the Battle of Zutphen, dying on October 17, 1586)
 Thomas Deloney:
 The Lamentation of Beckles, a ballad
 A Most Joyfull Songe, a ballad
 William Warner, Albions England; or, Historicall Map of the Same Island (see also second edition [six books] 1589, third edition [nine books] 1592, fourth edition [12 books] 1596, fifth edition [13 books, with Epitome] 1602, A Continuance of Albions England [books 14–16] 1606)
 Geoffrey Whitney, A Choice of Emblemes and Other Devises, influential emblem book

Other
 Jan Kochanowski, Piesni ("Songs"), Poland
 Francesco Patrizi, Della poetica la deca disputation, popularly known as the Deca ammirabile, Italian criticism
 Catherine Des Roches, also known as "Catherine Fradonnet", and her mother, Madeleine Des Roches, Les missives de Mesdames des Roches ... (in prose and verse), Paris: Abel L'Angelier; France

Births
Death years link to the corresponding "[year] in poetry" article:
 January 20 – Johann Hermann Schein born (died 1630), German composer
 April 12 (baptised) – John Ford (died c. 1639), English playwright and poet
 August 17 – Johannes Valentinus Andreae born (died 1654), German theologian
 Banarasidas (died 1643), Mughal Indian businessman and poet
 Dirk Rafaelsz Camphuysen (died 1627), Dutch painter, poet and theologian
 Approximate date – Giles Fletcher (died 1623), English poet chiefly known for the allegorical poem Christ's Victory and Triumph

Deaths

Birth years link to the corresponding "[year] in poetry" article:
 August 1 – Richard Maitland (born 1496), Scottish poet and lawyer
 September 20 – Chidiock Tichborne (born 1558), English conspirator and poet (executed)
 October 17 – Sir Philip Sidney (born 1554), English poet, courtier and soldier (died of wounds)
 Also:
 Birbal, real name: Maheshdas Bhat (born 1528), Indian poet, wit and Grand Vizier of the Mughal court of Emperor Akbar
 Ulpian Fulwell, English
 Lorenzo Gambara (born c. 1496), Italian, Latin-language poet
Sur (born 1479), Indian, Hindu devotional poet

See also

 16th century in poetry
 16th century in literature
 Dutch Renaissance and Golden Age literature
 Elizabethan literature
 French Renaissance literature
 Renaissance literature
 Spanish Renaissance literature
 University Wits

Notes

16th-century poetry
Poetry